Listen to My Song (Spanish: Escucha mi canción) is a 1959 Spanish musical film directed by Antonio del Amo and starring Joselito, Luz Márquez and Jesús Tordesillas.

The film's sets were designed by Sigfrido Burmann.

Synopsis
A poor boy with a great voice get on a television show. His real mother watches him and deeply knows that he is her son; then, there is a happy ending.

Cast
 Joselito as himself  
 Luz Márquez as Marta, madre de Joselito 
 Jesús Tordesillas as Marqués de Alvar, abuelo de Joselito 
 Barta Barri as Isabel  
 Pilar Sanclemente as Lucinda  
 Carlos Miguel Solá 
 Salvador Soler Marí 
 Dolores Villaespesa
 Ismael Elma 
 Antonio Fernández 
 Amalia Sánchez Ariño 
 Mariano Alcón 
 Domingo Rivas 
 Pedro Rodríguez de Quevedo 
 Gastón
 Kuki  
 Ana Sliska 
 Felixin Yuste 
 Amparo Amador
 Juan Romero (actor) 
 Laurette Marlu 
 Luis Solares 
 Carmen Pérez Gallo 
 Jesús Álvarez (actor) 
 Mariano Medina
 Mario Berriatúa

References

Bibliography 
 de España, Rafael. Directory of Spanish and Portuguese film-makers and films. Greenwood Press, 1994.

External links 
 

1959 musical films
Spanish musical films
1959 films
1950s Spanish-language films
Films directed by Antonio del Amo
Films produced by Cesáreo González
1950s Spanish films